Allen Jules Marcelin (born April 17, 1945) is a retired Canadian football player who played for the Ottawa Rough Riders. He played college football at Parsons College.

References

1945 births
Living people
Ottawa Rough Riders players
Place of birth missing (living people)
Parsons Wildcats football players